Gurpreet Singh may refer to:

 Gurpreet Singh (racewalker)
 Gurpreet Singh (footballer) (born 1984), Indian footballer who plays for Salgaocar as a defender in I-League
 Gurpreet Singh (sport shooter) (born 1987), Indian sports shooter
 Gurpreet Singh (actor) (born 1978), Indian actor
 Gurpreet Singh (artist) (born 1976), Indian painter
 Gurpreet Singh (kabaddi) (born 1979), Indian kabaddi player
 Gurpreet Singh (professor), Indian-born US professor of mechanical and nuclear engineering
 Gurpreet Singh Kangar Punjab MLA 2017-22
 Gurpreet Singh Lehal (born 1963), professor in the Computer Science Department, Punjabi University
 Gurpreet Singh Sandhu (born 1992), Indian footballer who currently plays for Bengaluru FC in the Indian Super League